Plagiochasma intermedium is a liverwort species in the genus Plagiochasma found in China.

Riccardin C, a macrocyclic bis(bibenzyl), can be found in P. intermedium.

References

External links 

Aytoniaceae